The Nineteenth Oklahoma Legislature was a meeting of the legislative branch of the government of Oklahoma, composed of the Oklahoma Senate and the Oklahoma House of Representatives. The state legislature met in regular session at the Oklahoma State Capitol in Oklahoma City from January 5 to April 1, 1943, and in special session April 10–21, 1944, during the term of Governor Robert S. Kerr. The special session was called by the governor to ensure military men and women could participate in the 1944 elections.

Dates of session
Regular session: January 5-April 1, 1943
Special session: April 10–21, 1944
Previous: 18th Legislature • Next: 20th Legislature

Party composition

Senate

House of Representatives

Leadership

Senate
As Lieutenant Governor of Oklahoma, James E. Berry served as the President of the Senate, giving him a tie-breaking vote and allowing him to serve as the presiding officer in ceremonial instances or during joint session. Tom Anglin served as the primary presiding officer, or President Pro Tempore of the Oklahoma Senate. He was a former Speaker of the Oklahoma House of Representatives, during the term of Governor William H. Murray.

House of Representatives
The Oklahoma Democratic Party held 93 seats in the Oklahoma House of Representatives in 1943, allowing them to select the Speaker of the Oklahoma House of Representatives. Harold Freeman of Pauls Valley, Oklahoma served in the role during the regular session in 1943 and Merle Lansden, a Marine private from Beaver, Oklahoma, served in the role during the special session in 1944. Freeman was unable to serve because of being called to serve. R.M. Mountcastle of Muskogee, Oklahoma served as the second-in-command, or Speaker Pro Tempore.

Members

Senate

Table based on Oklahoma Almanac.

House of Representatives

Table based on government database.

References

Oklahoma legislative sessions
1943 in Oklahoma
1944 in Oklahoma
1943 U.S. legislative sessions
1944 U.S. legislative sessions